Nada Milanović (born 1973) is a politician in Serbia. She served in the Assembly of Vojvodina from 2016 to 2020 and is currently a member of the municipal assembly of Pančevo. Milanović is a member of the Serbian Progressive Party.

Private career
Milanović is a culturologist. She lives in Pančevo.

Politician

Provincial politics
Milanović received the forty-ninth position on the Progressive Party's electoral list in the 2016 Vojvodina provincial election and was elected when the list won a majority victory with sixty-three out of 120 mandates. For the next four years, she served in the assembly as a supporter of the government.

She was given the eighty-first position on the Progressive-led Aleksandar Vučić — For Our Children list in the 2020 provincial election and narrowly missed direct election when the list won seventy-six mandates. She is currently the next in line to receive a mandate if another Progressive Party member leaves the assembly.

Municipal politics
Milanović was given the sixth position on the Progressive list for the Pančevo city assembly in the 2016 Serbian local elections and was elected when the list won a majority victory with thirty-nine out of seventy mandates. For the 2020 local elections, she was given the eighteenth position and was re-elected when the Progressive list won forty-seven mandates.

References

1973 births
Living people
Politicians from Pančevo
Members of the Assembly of Vojvodina
Serbian Progressive Party politicians